Kevin Darnell Vickerson (born January 8, 1983) is a former American football defensive end. He was drafted  by the Miami Dolphins in the seventh round of the 2005 NFL Draft. He played college football at Michigan State.

Vickerson has also been a member of the Tennessee Titans, Seattle Seahawks, Denver Broncos and Kansas City Chiefs.

Early years
Vickerson attended Martin Luther King High School in Detroit, Michigan. As a senior, he earned Prep All-America honors playing both offensive and defensive line while helping his team to a 10-1 record and a Public School League title.

College career
A four-year letterman at Michigan State, played in 44 games while starting 19 for the Spartans. He started two games as a freshman and started six the following year. As a senior, Vickerson started 11 contests and amassed 46 tackles and 4.5 sacks. In his career, Vickerson totaled 113 tackles including 24.5 for a loss, 8.5 sacks, a fumble recovery and a pair of blocked kicks. He majored in criminal justice.

Professional career

Miami Dolphins
Vickerson was drafted by former Miami Dolphins head coach Nick Saban with a seventh-round pick (216th overall) in the 2005 NFL Draft. After being late for numerous team meetings the Dolphins considered pulling their contract offer from the table, however he was signed on July 24. After spending two days on the Active/Non-Football Injury list, Vickerson was cleared to practice.

After compiling five tackles and a sack in preseason, Vickerson appeared likely to make the team. However, he was placed on Injured Reserve after suffering an ACL injury in a preseason game against the Atlanta Falcons on September 1.

Vickerson was on the bubble to make the team in 2006 and was rumored to be a candidate for the trading block, but in the end did make the final roster. He was inactive for all 16 contests in 2006, and after two seasons had never appeared in a regular season game for the Dolphins.

Vickerson became an unrestricted free agent on March 2, 2007 after the Dolphins declined to offer him a contract as an exclusive rights free agent. He was re-signed by the team and allocated to NFL Europa on March 9. In 10 starts for the Cologne Centurions, Vickerson recorded 31 tackles, 3.5 sacks and two passes defensed. He was named to the 2007 All-NFL Europa team.

Despite Vickerson's strong performance in NFL Europa, he was released by the Dolphins on August 27.

Tennessee Titans
Vickerson had a workout with the San Francisco 49ers on September 6, 2007 but was not signed. On November 1, he was signed to the practice squad of the Tennessee Titans - the team with which his brother Quartez attended training camp.

On November 28, Vickerson was promoted from the practice squad to the active roster after defensive tackle Demetrin Veal was released. He made his NFL debut on December 2, recording two assisted tackles in the team's 28-20 win over the Houston Texans.

Seattle Seahawks
Vickerson was traded to the Seattle Seahawks with LenDale White a fourth (111) and fifth (185) round pick in the 2010 NFL Draft for a fourth (104) and fifth (176) round pick in the 2010 NFL Draft. Vickerson was released before the start of the regular season on September 5, 2010.

Denver Broncos
Vickerson was signed by the Denver Broncos on September 7, 2010. On November 16, 2012, Vickerson was fined $15,000 for horse-collar tackling Carolina Panthers quarterback Cam Newton in Week 10.  Vickerson came under scrutiny in a highly anticipated Sunday Night Football game against the Indianapolis Colts with his three personal fouls and hit on Samson Satele, knocking Satele out of the game with a knee injury. The Broncos would go on to lose 39-33.

Vickerson was released by the Broncos on August 30, 2014. He signed with the Kansas City Chiefs on September 9.

Kansas City Chiefs
On September 9, 2014, Vickerson was signed by the Kansas City Chiefs.

New York Jets
Vickerson was signed by the New York Jets on March 24, 2015.

Personal life
Kevin's brother, Quartez Vickerson, played football at Grand Valley State and helped his team to a Division II national championship in 2005. He played with the Berlin Thunder of NFL Europa in the spring of 2007, and attended 2007 training camp with the Tennessee Titans.

References

External links
Michigan State Spartans bio
Denver Broncos bio

1983 births
Living people
Martin Luther King High School (Detroit) alumni
Players of American football from Detroit
American football defensive tackles
Michigan State Spartans football players
Miami Dolphins players
Cologne Centurions (NFL Europe) players
Tennessee Titans players
Seattle Seahawks players
Denver Broncos players
Kansas City Chiefs players
New York Jets players